Chicoreus (Chicoreus) cornucervi, common name Staghorn murex or Toothed murex, is a species of sea snail, a marine gastropod mollusk in the family Muricidae, the rock snails or murex snails.

Description
The shell size varies between 50 mm and  148 mm

Distribution
This species is distributed along Northwest Australia and Western Papua New Guinea.

References

External links 
 

Muricidae
Gastropods described in 1798